Thorbjørn Berntsen (born 13 April 1935) is a former Norwegian politician representing the Labour Party. He was Minister of the Environment from
1990 to 1997. He was also a member of the Storting for Oslo from 1977 to 1997.

References

1935 births
Living people
Ministers of Climate and the Environment of Norway
Members of the Storting
Labour Party (Norway) politicians
20th-century Norwegian politicians